Tetradymia is a genus of North American shrubs in the groundsel tribe within the sunflower family. Horsebrush is a common name for plants in this genus.

 Species

 formerly included
see Lepidospartum Psathyrotes 
 Tetradymia ramosissima - Psathyrotes ramosissima 
 Tetradymia squamata - Lepidospartum squamatum

References

Senecioneae
Asteraceae genera
Flora of North America